Toivo Mäkikyrö (born 29 January 1957) is a Finnish biathlete. He competed in the 10 km sprint event at the 1984 Winter Olympics.

References

External links
 

1957 births
Living people
Finnish male biathletes
Olympic biathletes of Finland
Biathletes at the 1984 Winter Olympics
People from Pello
Sportspeople from Lapland (Finland)